Prosoplus bimaculatus is a species of beetle in the family Cerambycidae. It was described by Per Olof Christopher Aurivillius in 1907. It is known from Papua New Guinea.

References

Prosoplus
Beetles described in 1907